The 2016 EuroHockey Club Champions Cup is the 44th edition of the premier European competition for women's field hockey clubs. For the second year in a row, SCHC has the honour to organize the championship. The tournament was played in Bilthoven, Netherlands between 13 May and 16 May 2016. Eight teams from six countries participated in the tournament.

Results

Bracket

Quarter-finals

Fifth to eighth place classification

Crossover

Seventh and eighth place

Fifth and sixth place

First to fourth place classification

Semi-finals

Third place

Final

Notes

Statistics

Awards

Final ranking

 Den Bosch
 SCHC
 Hamburg
 Club de Campo
 Canterbury
 Surbiton
 Krylatskoye
 Pegasus

References

External links
 Altius RT - Eurohockey - Tournament results and statistics

EuroHockey Club Champions Cup (women)
EuroHockey Club Champions Cup
EuroHockey Club Champions Cup
International women's field hockey competitions hosted by the Netherlands
EuroHockey Club Champions Cup
EuroHockey Club Champions Cup
Sport in De Bilt